Ammar Alhaqbani (born 15 December 1998) is a Saudi Arabia-born American tennis player.

Alhaqbani has a career high ATP singles ranking of 1580 achieved on 30 April 2018. He also has a career high ATP doubles ranking of 2134 achieved on 2 August 2021.

Alhaqbani represents Saudi Arabia at the Davis Cup, where he has a W/L record of 28–6.

Alhaqbani played college tennis at the University of Virginia.

References

External links

1997 births
Living people
Saudi Arabian male tennis players
American male tennis players
Virginia Cavaliers men's tennis players
Sportspeople from Riyadh
Sportspeople from Alexandria, Virginia